Football league system in Czechoslovakia was a series of interconnected leagues for club football in Czechoslovakia.

The system

1990s

See also
 Football league system in the Czech Republic
 Football league system in Slovakia

    
Czechoslovakia

lt:Čekoslovakijos futbolo sistema